Brachystomella parvula is a species of springtail in the family Brachystomellidae. It is found in Europe.

References

External links

 

Collembola
Articles created by Qbugbot
Animals described in 1896